The National Government of 1931–1935 was formed by Ramsay MacDonald following his reappointment as Prime Minister of the United Kingdom by King George V after the general election in October 1931.

As a National Government it contained members of the Conservative Party, Liberals, Liberal Nationals and National Labour, as well as a number of individuals who belonged to no political party. The Liberal Nationals had previously not held office in MacDonald's previous National Government, though two junior ministers appointed as Liberals had defected to them. Their relationship with the main Liberal Party had been unclear but following the election, the Liberal Nationals officially repudiated the official Liberal Party whip.

During the course of the Ministry the ministers from the Liberal Party, led by Sir Herbert Samuel, resigned over the adoption of a protectionist policy caused by the government negotiating the Ottawa Accords in 1932. The other Liberal faction in the Ministry, the Liberal National Party, had accepted the Conservative policy of protectionism before the National government had been formed so its ministers continued in office.

In June 1935, MacDonald resigned and was replaced as Prime Minister by Stanley Baldwin.

Cabinet

November 1931 – May 1935
  Ramsay MacDonald – Prime Minister and Leader of the House of Commons
  The Lord Sankey – Lord Chancellor
  Stanley Baldwin – Lord President
  The Viscount Snowden – Lord Privy Seal
  Neville Chamberlain – Chancellor of the Exchequer
  Sir Herbert Samuel – Home Secretary
  Sir John Simon – Foreign Secretary
  Sir Philip Cunliffe-Lister – Colonial Secretary
  J. H. Thomas – Dominions Secretary
  The Viscount Hailsham – Secretary of State for War and Leader of the House of Lords
  Sir Samuel Hoare – Secretary of State for India
  The Marquess of Londonderry – Secretary for Air
  Sir Archibald Sinclair – Secretary of State for Scotland
  Sir Bolton Eyres-Monsell – First Lord of the Admiralty
  Walter Runciman – President of the Board of Trade
  Sir John Gilmour – Minister of Agriculture
  Sir Donald Maclean – President of the Board of Education
  Henry Betterton – Minister of Labour
  Hilton Young – Minister of Health
  William Ormsby-Gore – First Commissioner of Works

Changes
 June 1932 –  Lord Irwin succeeds Donald Maclean (deceased) as President of the Board of Education
 September 1932 – Stanley Baldwin succeeds Philip Snowden as Lord Privy Seal, remaining also Lord President. John Gilmour succeeds Herbert Samuel as Home Secretary.  Sir Godfrey Collins succeeds Sir Archibald Sinclair as Scottish Secretary.  Walter Elliot succeeds Gilmour as Minister of Agriculture.
 December 1933 – Stanley Baldwin ceases to be Lord Privy Seal, and his successor in that office is not in the cabinet. He continues as Lord President.  Kingsley Wood enters the cabinet as Postmaster-General
 June 1934 –  Oliver Stanley succeeds Henry Betterton as Minister of Labour

Key
  = Member of National Labour
  = Member of the Conservative Party
  = Member of the Liberal Party
  = Member of the Liberal National Party

List of ministers
Members of the Cabinet are in bold face.

Notes

References

 Bassett, Reginald. 1931 Political Crisis (2nd ed., Aldershot: Macmillan 1986) 
 Butler, David, and G. Butler, Twentieth Century British Political Facts 1900–2000
 
 Hattersley, Roy. Borrowed Time: The Story of Britain Between the Wars (2008) pp 143–72.
 Howell, David. MacDonald's Party: Labour Identities and Crisis, 1922–1931 (Oxford U.P. 2002). 
 Hyde, H. Montgomery. Baldwin: The Unexpected Prime Minister (1973)
 Jenkins, Roy.  Baldwin (1987)  excerpt and text search
 Marquand, David. Ramsay MacDonald (1977)
 Mowat, Charles Loch. Britain between the Wars: 1918–1945 (1955) pp. 413–79
 Raymond, John, ed. The Baldwin Age (1960), essays by scholars 252 pages; online
 Skidelsky, Robert. Politicians and the Slump: the Labour Government of 1929–1931. (1967.)
 Smart, Nick.  The National Government. 1931–40 (Macmillan 1999) 
 
 Taylor, A.J.P. English History 1914–1945 (1965) pp 321–88
 Thorpe, Andrew. The British general election of 1931 (Oxford UP, 1991).
 Thorpe, Andrew. Britain in the 1930s. The Deceptive Decade, (Oxford: Blackwell, 1992). 
 Williamson, Philip. National Crisis and National Government. British Politics, the Economy and the Empire, 1926–1932, (Cambridge UP, 1992). 

Ministry 3
1930s in the United Kingdom
1931 establishments in the United Kingdom
1935 disestablishments in the United Kingdom
Political history of the United Kingdom
Coalition governments of the United Kingdom
British ministries
Ministries of George V
Cabinets established in 1931
Cabinets disestablished in 1935
Interwar Britain
1931 in British politics

pl:Trzeci rząd Ramsaya MacDonalda